The Dublin Hurler of the Year is an award presented to the best hurling player of the year for Dublin GAA.

Former Winners
Conal Keaney and Liam Rushe  - 2011
Rónán Fallon – (St Vincents) – 2007
Tomás Brady – (Na Fianna) – 2006
Rónán Fallon – (St Vincents) – 2005
Michael Carton (O'Tooles) 2004
Conal Keaney (Ballyboden St Endas) – 2003
Shane Martin – 2002
Tomás McGrane – 2001
Brendan McLoughlin – 2000
Tomás McGrane – 1999
Liam Walsh – 1998
Ruairí Boland – 1997
Seán Power – 1996
Liam Walsh -1995
Brian McMahon – 1994
Brian Kelleher – 1992
Vincent Conroy (St. Vincents)- 1981
Peadar Carton – 1978

Hurling awards
 
Lists of hurling players